Richmond is a town in Cheshire County, New Hampshire, United States. The population was 1,197 at the 2020 census.

History
The town was first chartered in 1735 by Governor Jonathan Belcher of Massachusetts. Granted to soldiers returning from the war in Canada, it was named "Sylvester-Canada" in honor of Captain Joseph Sylvester of Scituate, Massachusetts, who was killed in 1690 during an attempt to capture the city of Quebec. After the border between Massachusetts and New Hampshire was fixed, the town fell on the New Hampshire side of the line. It was incorporated in 1752 as "Richmond" by Governor Benning Wentworth. He named it after Charles Lennox, 3rd Duke of Richmond, a staunch advocate of colonial independence. It was settled about 1757 by emigrants from Rhode Island and Massachusetts.

Geography
The Franconia Mountain Range (not to be confused with the much higher ridge in the White Mountains to the north) is a  chain of hills in the western part of town.

Richmond is served by state routes 32 and 119.

Adjacent municipalities
 Swanzey (north)
 Troy (northeast)
 Fitzwilliam (east)
 Royalston, Massachusetts (southeast)
 Warwick, Massachusetts (southwest)
 Winchester (west)

Demographics

As of the census of 2000, there were 1,077 people, 379 households, and 285 families residing in the town.  The population density was 28.7 people per square mile (11.1/km).  There were 432 housing units at an average density of 11.5 per square mile (4.4/km).  The racial makeup of the town was 97.68% White, 0.37% African American, 0.46% Native American, 0.19% Asian, 0.19% from other races, and 1.11% from two or more races. Hispanic or Latino of any race were 0.56% of the population.

There were 379 households, out of which 35.1% had children under the age of 18 living with them, 67.5% were married couples living together, 4.5% had a female householder with no husband present, and 24.8% were non-families. 19.3% of all households were made up of individuals, and 5.8% had someone living alone who was 65 years of age or older.  The average household size was 2.82 and the average family size was 3.22.

In the town, the population was spread out, with 29.2% under the age of 18, 5.4% from 18 to 24, 28.6% from 25 to 44, 25.5% from 45 to 64, and 11.2% who were 65 years of age or older.  The median age was 38 years. For every 100 females, there were 105.5 males.  For every 100 females age 18 and over, there were 102.7 males.

The median income for a household in the town was $49,141, and the median income for a family was $54,625. Males had a median income of $37,083 versus $27,500 for females. The per capita income for the town was $21,174.  About 4.6% of families and 7.6% of the population were below the poverty line, including 8.5% of those under age 18 and 7.6% of those age 65 or over.

Religious institutions
At Richmond Four Corners, the center of town, is the Richmond Community United Methodist Church, a brick Greek revival-style edifice built in 1837.

Since 1988, Richmond has been the home of Saint Benedict Center, a traditionalist Catholic community with monastery, convent, chapel, and school. In January 2019, the vicar for canonical affairs for the Roman Catholic Diocese of Manchester stated that the group had been directed to stop representing themselves as Catholic. The diocese of Manchester published a clarification of the status of the Slaves of the Immaculate Heart of Mary and the St. Benedict Center, namely that they were not approved by the diocese nor to be considered Catholic. That same document further states that priests are forbidden to say Mass at any church or chapel owned by the St. Benedict Center or the Slaves of the Immaculate Heart of Mary.

Notable people 

 Hosea Ballou (1771–1852), clergyman, theologian
 Horatio Admiral Nelson (1816–1882), merchant, politician in Quebec
 Joseph Weeks (1773–1845), US congressman

Footnotes

Further reading
 William Bassett, History of the Town of Richmond, Cheshire County, New Hampshire: From Its First Settlement, to 1882. Boston: C.W. Calkins and Co., 1884.
 Neith Boyce and Beatrix Faust, The Town in the Forest: Life Story of Richmond, New Hampshire. Richmond, NH: Richmond Archives, 1992.
 Richard A. Martin, The Only Mill in Town: The Story of the Pail-making Industry in Richmond, New Hampshire. Richmond, NH: Friends of Historic Richmond, 1995.
 June Riedrich Zublic, The Land Forever: The Power of the Land in One Family: Abraham Phillips, from 1778, of Richmond, New Hampshire. Turnersville, NJ: J.R. Zublic, 1999.

External links
 
 The Richmond Rooster
 New Hampshire Economic and Labor Market Information Bureau Profile

 
Towns in Cheshire County, New Hampshire
Towns in New Hampshire